The meridian 115° west of Greenwich is a line of longitude that extends from the North Pole across the Arctic Ocean, North America, the Pacific Ocean, the Southern Ocean, and Antarctica to the South Pole.

The 115th meridian west forms a great circle with the 65th meridian east.

Between the equator and the 60th parallel south it forms the eastern boundary of the South Pacific Nuclear-Weapon-Free Zone and the western boundary of the Latin American Nuclear-Weapon-Free Zone.

From Pole to Pole
Starting at the North Pole and heading south to the South Pole, the 115th meridian west passes through:

{| class="wikitable plainrowheaders"
! scope="col" width="130" | Co-ordinates
! scope="col" | Country, territory or sea
! scope="col" | Notes
|-
| style="background:#b0e0e6;" | 
! scope="row" style="background:#b0e0e6;" | Arctic Ocean
| style="background:#b0e0e6;" |
|-
| 
! scope="row" | 
| Northwest Territories — Brock Island
|-
| style="background:#b0e0e6;" | 
! scope="row" style="background:#b0e0e6;" | Ballantyne Strait
| style="background:#b0e0e6;" |
|-valign="top"
| style="background:#b0e0e6;" | 
! scope="row" style="background:#b0e0e6;" | Unnamed waterbody
| style="background:#b0e0e6;" | Passing just west of Emerald Isle, Northwest Territories,  at 
|-
| 
! scope="row" | 
| Northwest Territories — Melville Island
|-
| style="background:#b0e0e6;" | 
! scope="row" style="background:#b0e0e6;" | M'Clure Strait
| style="background:#b0e0e6;" |
|-
| 
! scope="row" | 
| Northwest Territories — Victoria Island
|-
| style="background:#b0e0e6;" | 
! scope="row" style="background:#b0e0e6;" | Prince Albert Sound
| style="background:#b0e0e6;" |
|-valign="top"
| 
! scope="row" | 
|-valign="top"
| style="background:#b0e0e6;" | 
! scope="row" style="background:#b0e0e6;" | Dolphin and Union Strait
| style="background:#b0e0e6;" |
|-
| 
! scope="row" | 
| Nunavut - mainland
|-
| style="background:#b0e0e6;" | 
! scope="row" style="background:#b0e0e6;" | Coronation Gulf
| style="background:#b0e0e6;" |
|-valign="top"
| 
! scope="row" | 
|-valign="top"
| 
! scope="row" | 
|-valign="top"
| 
! scope="row" | 
| Baja California Sonora — for about 12 km from  Baja California — from  Sonora — for about 2 km from  Baja California — from 
|-
| style="background:#b0e0e6;" | 
! scope="row" style="background:#b0e0e6;" | Pacific Ocean
| style="background:#b0e0e6;" | Sebastián Vizcaíno Bay, passing just east of Cedros Island,  at 
|-
| 
! scope="row" | 
| Baja California Sur
|-valign="top"
| style="background:#b0e0e6;" | 
! scope="row" style="background:#b0e0e6;" | Pacific Ocean
| style="background:#b0e0e6;" | Passing just west of Clarion Island,  at 
|-
| style="background:#b0e0e6;" | 
! scope="row" style="background:#b0e0e6;" | Southern Ocean
| style="background:#b0e0e6;" |
|-
| 
! scope="row" | Antarctica
| Unclaimed territory
|-
|}

See also
114th meridian west
116th meridian west
Eutelsat 115 West B

w115 meridian west